Yvette A. Flunder (born July 29, 1955) is an American womanist, preacher, pastor, activist, and singer from San Francisco, CA. She is the senior pastor of the City of Refuge United Church of Christ in Oakland, California and Presiding Bishop of The Fellowship of Affirming Ministries.

Life 
Flunder was born in San Francisco, California and raised between the Bay Area and Mississippi. She grew up in the Church of God in Christ (COGIC), graduating from the High School from COGIC's Saints Academy in Lexington, Mississippi before returning to California. In 1984, she began singing and recording with Walter Hawkins and the Love Center Choir, where she was the lead singer. She was later ordained by Hawkins.

Flunder earned an undergraduate degree from College of San Mateo. She then went on to receive a Certificate of Ministry Studies and a Master of Arts in 1997 from the Pacific School of Religion, before earning her Doctor of Ministry degree from the San Francisco Theological Seminary in 2001.

In 2000, she founded the Fellowship of Affirming Ministries, a trans-denominational coalition of Christian churches who "desire to celebrate and proclaim the radically inclusive love of Jesus Christ", and was appointed its Presiding Bishop in 2003.

Flunder identifies as a womanist and a reconciling liberation theologian. In 2005, she authored a book, Where the Edge Gathers: Building a Community of Radical Inclusion. Carlton Pearson cites her among the first religious leaders to embrace and encourage him after he was declared a heretic due to coming out in support of universal reconciliation.

In 2013, she was named as a Distinguished Alumna of the Pacific School of Religion. On December 1, 2014, Flunder was a keynote speaker in the White House for World AIDS Day, where she described the harmful effects of stigma and homophobia on those living with HIV and on AIDS education in general. The following year she was a guest speaker at the American Baptist College's Garnett-Nabrit Lecture Series.

Since 2015, Flunder has been a member of the board of trustees of the Starr King School for the Ministry and also served as a member of the Presidential Advisory Council on HIV/AIDS.

Flunder's spouse is Shirley Miller, the cousin of Walter Hawkins; they have been committed partners since the mid-1980s.

Ministry 
Bishop Flunder was raised in the "womb" of the church coming from church founding families in the Bay Area.

From a young age, Flunder's life reflected her beliefs to treat people with value and equality. In 1986, Flunder was moved to minister to people with HIV/AIDS in response to the epidemic of the 1980s. She founded several not-for-profit enterprises in the San Francisco Bay Area, providing services for people affected by HIV: Hazard-Ashley House, Walker House and Restoration House, through the Ark of Refuge, Inc., which later became the Y. A. Flunder Foundation.

In 1991, she founded the City of Refuge under the United Church of Christ, "in order to unite a gospel ministry with a social ministry". She describes the City of Refuge UCC as an effort to "create a spiritual community that will embrace our collective cultures, faith paths, gender expressions, and sexual/affectional orientations while simultaneously freeing us from oppressive theologies that subjugate women, denigrate the LGBT community, and disconnect us from justice issues locally and globally". The Transcendence Gospel Choir was a community choir affiliated with the City of Refuge and was the first all-transgender choir in the United States.

Flunder's work expands into digital spaces. In 2021 she was a panelist for "Fire and Desire" the Smithsonian National Museum of African American History and Culture's Center for the Study of African American Religious Life as they discussed "Black Male Gospel Music Performance."

Film, television and media 
Flunder was portrayed by actress Phylicia Rashad for the final 3-part episode as part of the Dustin Lance Black mini-series When We Rise on March 3, 2017, on the major television network ABC. The Bishop's role in the show highlights the compassion of the church, the commitment of its leadership and the loving home the church provides to minister in the tough, primarily African-American community in San Francisco.

Flunder was also depicted by Joni Bovill in the Joshua Marston drama film Come Sunday, which premiered at the 2018 Sundance Film Festival and was released on Netflix in April 2018.

Flunder is active on many social media platforms using her platforms to consistently advocate for black lives, queer lives, medical accessibility, and destigmatization of HIV+ lives.

In 2021, Flunder was featured in PBS's "The Black Church: This is our story, this is our song."

Published work 
 Where the Edge Gathers
 Birthing the Sermon: Women Preachers on the Creative Process 
 Those Preaching Women: A Multicultural Collection
 Queer Christianities: Lived Religion in Transgressive Forms

References

External links
City of Refuge UCC
Yvette Flunder | Starr King
Yvette Flunder - Profile - Working Preacher

1955 births
20th-century Protestant theologians
21st-century Protestant theologians
Activists from the San Francisco Bay Area
African-American Christian clergy
20th-century African-American women singers
African-American feminists
African-American women writers
African-American writers
American bishops
American Christian clergy
American Christian theologians
American Christian writers
American feminist writers
American health activists
American Protestant ministers and clergy
Bishops in California
Feminist musicians
HIV/AIDS activists
Lesbian feminists
American lesbian musicians
American lesbian writers
LGBT African Americans
LGBT bishops
LGBT people from California
LGBT Protestant clergy
American LGBT rights activists
Living people
Proponents of Christian feminism
Protestant writers
Religious leaders from the San Francisco Bay Area
Singers from San Francisco
United Church of Christ ministers
Womanist theologians
Womanist writers
Women bishops
Women Christian theologians
Writers from San Francisco
American women non-fiction writers
21st-century African-American women
20th-century American LGBT people
21st-century American LGBT people